The Tallahassee Capitals were a Minor League Baseball team, based in Tallahassee, Florida, United States, that operated between 1935 and 1951.

History

The team originated in the Georgia–Florida League as the Capitals. They had affiliation deals with the New York Giants (1935–1936), Brooklyn Dodgers (1938) and Cleveland Indians (1939). The onset of World War II led to the team temporarily shutting down in 1942.

When the war ended, they reformed as an affiliate of the Pittsburgh Pirates in 1946, now known as the Tallahassee Pirates.

When that agreement ended, they joined the Alabama–Florida League for one last season, in 1951, as the Tallahassee Citizens.

The ballpark

The Capitals played at Centennial Field. Centennial Field was built in 1925 and demolished in 1975. It was located on South Monroe Street just South of the State Capitol Building. Today, the site has been repurposed and hosts a new Centennial Field at Cascades Park, which is on the National Register of Historic Places.

Notable alumni

 Mickey Haefner (1939)

 Phil Seghi (1947)

 Frank Thomas (1948-1949) 3 x MLB All-Star

Year-by-Year Record

References

External links 
 Tallahassee, Florida baseball reference

Defunct minor league baseball teams
Brooklyn Dodgers minor league affiliates
Pittsburgh Pirates minor league affiliates
Cleveland Guardians minor league affiliates
New York Giants minor league affiliates
Defunct baseball teams in Florida
Sports in Tallahassee, Florida
1935 establishments in Florida
1951 disestablishments in Florida
Baseball teams established in 1935
Sports clubs disestablished in 1951
Baseball teams disestablished in 1951